Jackson Karugaba Kafuuzi, (born 25 April 1977), is a Ugandan politician who serves as the incumbent Member of Parliament representing the
Kyaka South County Constituency, Kyegegwa District, in the 10th Ugandan Parliament (2016 to 2021).

Effective 14 December 2019, he concurrently serves as the Deputy Attorney General of Uganda, in the Ugandan Cabinet.

Background and education
He was born in Kyegegwa District, in the Toro sub-region, in the Western Region of Uganda, on 25 April 1977. He attended St. Joseph's Primary School, Nabbingo. He studied at St. Maria Goretti Secondary School, for his O-Level studies, graduating with a Uganda Certificate of Education, in 1995. In 1998, he completed his A-Level education, graduating with a Uganda Advanced Certificate of Education.

He was admitted to Makerere University, Uganda's oldest and largest public university, graduating in 2002 with a Bachelor of Laws degree. The following year, he obtained a Diploma in Legal Practice, from the Law Development Centre, in Kampala, Uganda's capital city, and was admitted to the Uganda Bar.

Career before politics
For a period of 13 years, from 2003 until 2016, Jackson Kafuuzi was an attorney at Rwakafuuzi & Company Advocates, a Kampala-based legal firm.

Political career
He entered Uganda's elective politics by contesting for the Kyaka South County Constituency parliamentary seat in 2011 on FDC ticket but lost to an NRM candidate who had quite teaching at makerere university. He later chose to run on an NRM ticket in 2016 after realizing the hefty mistakes made by his predecessor abandoning the latter.   He was elected, and is the current substantive member of parliament for that constituency. He is a member of the ruling National Resistance Movement political party.

On 14 December 2019, he was named in the cabinet of Uganda as the Deputy Attorney General of Uganda; a position he was appointed to by the Head of State of Uganda Yoweri Kaguta Museveni. After parliamentary approval, his swearing-in took place as scheduled, on Tuesday, 11 February 2020.

See also
 Frank Tumwebaze
 Molly Nawe Kamukama

References

External links
Website of Parliament of Uganda

1977 births
Living people
Toro people
People from Kyegegwa District
People from Western Region, Uganda
Law Development Centre alumni
Government ministers of Uganda
National Resistance Movement politicians
Makerere University alumni
Members of the Parliament of Uganda
21st-century Ugandan politicians